Harry Fenton "Larry" Schlafly (September 19, 1878 – June 27, 1919) was an American Major League Baseball player and manager born in Port Washington, Ohio. He didn't play in the majors again until  when he played for the Washington Senators. Statistically, it was his best season of his career, playing in 123 games, hit .246, and stole 29 bases. He would stay on the next season as the manager only.

He died from spinal meningitis in Beach City, Ohio on June 27, 1919.

See also
List of Major League Baseball player–managers

References

External links

Mindspring Biography

1878 births
1919 deaths
Baseball players from Ohio
Major League Baseball second basemen
Chicago Orphans players
Washington Senators (1901–1960) players
Buffalo Buffeds players
People from Port Washington, Ohio
Minor league baseball managers
Youngstown Puddlers players
Evansville River Rats players
Columbus Senators players
Toledo Swamp Angels players
Terre Haute Hottentots players
Milwaukee Brewers (minor league) players
Oakland Oaks (baseball) players
Los Angeles Angels (minor league) players
Portland Giants players
Toronto Maple Leafs (International League) players
Newark Indians players
Troy Trojans (minor league) players
Jersey City Skeeters players
Bradford Drillers players
Major League Baseball player-managers
People from Beach City, Ohio